is a 2015 Japanese television drama, starring Miki Nakatani, Asami Mizukawa, Shohei Miura, Nanao, Midoriko Kimura, Kyoko Enami, Ryo Ishibashi and Tetsushi Tanaka. The series was aired on Fuji TV from January 13 to March 17, 2015 on Tuesdays at 21:00 (JST) for 10 episodes.

Synopsis

Yuki Kawahara came to Tokyo to give herself a year to become a published novelist. On the brink of failure, she has a chance encounter with Futo Oda, a junior executive at a major publisher to whom she tries to give her novel. Oda, however, is preoccupied with finding an assistant for an irascible, but highly successful novelist, Risa Tono, whose works his company publishes. He persuades Yuki to take the job, which she agrees to do on a temporary basis, for she will soon return to her home town to marry her fiancé.

At first, she is given menial jobs but soon, Risa discovers that her new assistant is a talented writer and she gives her small writing jobs. It turns out that Risa is burned out and can no longer write. Gradually, Yuki becomes her indispensable ghost writer. Thinking she will get an opportunity to develop her career through her association with Risa, Yuki does not return home as planned. But tensions arise between the two women and eventually they fall out.  How their relationship proceeds is the heart of the story of the series.

Cast 
 Miki Nakatani as Risa Tono
 Asami Mizukawa as Yuki Kawahar
 Shohei Miura as Futo Oda
 Nanao as Manami Tsukada
 Yuichi Haba as Shinya Okano
 Kenji Mizuhashi as Tomiyuki Tsubota
 Yu Koyanagi as Hirosayu Ozaki
 Mahiro Takasugi as Daiki Tono
 Midoriko Kimura as Misuzu Taura
 Kyoko Enami as Motoko Tono
 Ryo Ishibashi as Masayoshi Torikai
 Tetsushi Tanaka as Yuji Kanzaki

Episodes

References

External links
  
 

2015 in Japanese television
Japanese drama television series
2015 Japanese television series debuts
2015 Japanese television series endings
Fuji TV dramas